The 2014 Drive to Stop Diabetes 300 presented by Lilly Diabetes was the fourth stock car race of the 2014 NASCAR Nationwide Series season, and the 32nd iteration of the event. The race was held on Saturday, March 15, 2014, in Bristol, Tennessee, at Bristol Motor Speedway, a 0.533 miles (0.858 km) permanent oval-shaped racetrack. The race took the scheduled 300 laps to complete. On the final restart with nine to go, Kyle Busch, driving for Joe Gibbs Racing, would hold off the field to win his 65th career NASCAR Nationwide Series win and his second of the season. To fill out the podium, Kyle Larson, driving for Turner Scott Motorsports, and Kevin Harvick, driving for JR Motorsports, would finish second and third, respectively.

Background 

The Bristol Motor Speedway, formerly known as Bristol International Raceway and Bristol Raceway, is a NASCAR short track venue located in Bristol, Tennessee. Constructed in 1960, it held its first NASCAR race on July 30, 1961. Despite its short length, Bristol is among the most popular tracks on the NASCAR schedule because of its distinct features, which include extraordinarily steep banking, an all concrete surface, two pit roads, and stadium-like seating. It has also been named one of the loudest NASCAR tracks.

Entry list 

 (R) denotes rookie driver.
 (i) denotes driver who is ineligible for series driver points.

*Withdrew after wrecking in first practice.

Practice

First practice 
The first practice session was held on Friday, March 1, at 1:40 PM EST. The session would last for 50 minutes.

Second and final practice 
The final practice session, sometimes known as Happy Hour, was held on Friday, March 1, at 3:00 PM EST. The session would last for one hour and 25 minutes.

Qualifying 
Qualifying was held on Saturday, March 15, at 10:10 AM EST. Since Bristol Motor Speedway is under  in length, the qualifying system was a multi-car system that included two rounds. The first round was 30 minutes, where every driver would be able to set a lap within the 30 minutes. Then, the second round would consist of the fastest 12 drivers in round 1, and drivers would have 10 minutes to set a time. Whoever set the fastest time in round 2 would win the pole.

Willie Allen was the only driver to fail to qualify.

Full qualifying results 

*Time unavailable.

Race results

Standings after the race 

Drivers' Championship standings

Note: Only the first 10 positions are included for the driver standings.

References 

2014 NASCAR Nationwide Series
NASCAR races at Bristol Motor Speedway
March 2014 sports events in the United States
2014 in sports in Tennessee